Ogahalla is an unincorporated place and railway point in geographic Barlow Township in the Unorganized North Part of Cochrane District in northeastern Ontario, Canada.

It is also on Ogahalla Creek, part of the James Bay drainage basin, which flows via the Atikasibi River to the Kenogami River.

A now abandoned airfield, created by the Department of National Defence in the mid-1930s in part using 22,632 person-days of unemployment relief labour, lies to the north of the place. A Frontier College instructor was located at the construction camp. The airfield became in the late 1930s part of a string of emergency landing sites for Trans-Canada Air Lines (today Air Canada) to support their transcontinental flight operations.

References

Communities in Cochrane District